The 1972 English cricket season was the 73rd in which the County Championship had been an official competition. There was an increase in limited overs cricket with the introduction of the Benson & Hedges Cup, which was part mini-league and part knockout along the lines of soccer's World Cup competition. It caused another reduction in the number of County Championship matches and the B&H (as it was often called) was never popular among cricket's traditional followers. The tournament lasted until 2002, after which it was effectively replaced by Twenty20. The County Championship was won by Warwickshire for the third time in their history. Australia toured England and the Test series was drawn 2–2.

Honours
County Championship – Warwickshire
Gillette Cup – Lancashire
Sunday League – Kent
Benson & Hedges Cup – Leicestershire
Minor Counties Championship – Bedfordshire
Second XI Championship – Nottinghamshire II 
Wisden – Greg Chappell, Dennis Lillee, Bob Massie, John Snow, Keith Stackpole

Test series

A very entertaining England v Australia series resulted in a 2–2 draw, which meant that England retained the Ashes.  There was an outstanding individual performance by Australian seamer Bob Massie who, assisted by heavy atmospheric conditions that enabled him to "swing" the ball prodigiously, took 16 wickets in the Lord's Test.

County Championship

Gillette Cup

Benson & Hedges Cup

Sunday League

Leading batsmen

Leading bowlers

References

Annual reviews
 Playfair Cricket Annual 1973
 Wisden Cricketers' Almanack 1973

External links
 CricketArchive – season and tournament itineraries

1972 in English cricket
English cricket seasons in the 20th century